Heeralaal Pannalaal may refer to:

Heeralaal Pannalal (1978 film), Bollywood film starring Shashi Kapoor & Zeenat Aman
Heeralal Pannalal (1999 film), Bollywood film starring Mithun Chakraborty & Johnny Lever